The Rug Maker's Daughter is a 1915 American adventure silent film directed by Oscar Apfel and written by Julia Crawford Ivers. The film stars Maud Allan, Forrest Stanley, Jane Darwell, Howard Davies, Herbert Standing and Laura Woods Cushing. The film was released on July 5, 1915, by Paramount Pictures.

Plot

Cast 
Maud Allan as Demetra
Forrest Stanley as Robert Van Buren
Jane Darwell as Mrs. Van Buren
Howard Davies as Osman
Herbert Standing as Halib Bey
Laura Woods Cushing as Barah
Harrington Gibbs as John Marshall
Mary Ruby

Preservation status
A fragment (400 feet) exists of the film at the BFI National Archive.

References

External links 
 

1915 films
1910s English-language films
American adventure films
1915 adventure films
Paramount Pictures films
Films directed by Oscar Apfel
American black-and-white films
American silent feature films
1910s American films
Silent adventure films